Wangen im Allgäu (Low Alemannic: Wãnge) is a historic city in southeast Baden-Württemberg, Germany. It lies north-east of Lake Constance in the Westallgäu. It is the second-largest city (Population: 26,927 in 2020) in the Ravensburg district and is a nexus for the surrounding communities. From 1938 to 1972, Wangen was the county seat of the Wangen rural district.

Geography
Wangen in Allgäu lies on the north bank of the Obere Argen. The Untere Argen flows past northwest Wangen and unites southwest of the city with the Obere Argen. The city today is shaped by its historical town center as well as by numerous nearby districts.

Neighboring municipalities
Several settlements border Wangen. Their names are as follows: Amtzell, Vogt, Kißlegg, Argenbühl, and Achberg (Ravensburg district), Hergatz and Hergensweiler (Lindau district), and Neukirch (Bodensee district).

History

The city was first mentioned in 815 under the name "Wangun" in a monastery document.

In 1217, Emperor Fredrick II declared in a document that Wangen should remain in royal hands. In 1286, King Rudolph I granted Wangen the status of free imperial city.

During the late Middle Ages, the city's growth was amplified by its central location at the crossroads between Ravensburg, Lindau, Leutkirch, and Isny and the growing trade through the Alps.

Wangen's production and export of manufactured goods, particularly scythes and canvas, gave the city a tremendous positive trade balance. This surplus money was used to acquire lands outside of the city walls, thus giving Wangen a safeguard against economic fluctuations.

During the German Mediatisation, in 1802, Wangen lost its status as a Free City and was incorporated into the Kingdom of Bavaria; it later changed hands in 1810 to the Kingdom of Württemberg.

In 1936, the city was officially named "Wangen in Allgäu".

From 1938 up unto its dissolution and integration into the Ravensburg district in 1972, Wangen was the capital of the Wangen rural district. In 1973, Wangen was officially designated by the Baden-Württemberg state government to Großen Kreisstadt (large district town) due to its population having reached 20,000.

In 1999, the largest flood in the most recent 50 years of Wangen's history completely flooded the lower city. The city was again flooded in 2006 by the Obere Argen.

During the 2006 FIFA World Cup, the national team of Togo stayed in Wangen.

Main sights

Despite several major fires in 1539, 1793, and 1858, the old part of the town remains a juxtaposition of architectural elements ranging from those of the early middle ages to those of the late baroque era.

The Oberstadtkirche St. Martin ("St Martin's Upper City Church") is one of Wangen's oldest buildings. The church was already present in the 9th century; it was renovated numerous times in the following years. It contains both Romanesque and Gothic architecture.

The Ravensburg Gate is the city's prime landmark. It was first mentioned in 1472, but was probably changed to its current appearance in 1608. The building is decorated with Renaissance-era artwork. Similarly aged relics of the old city include the Lindau Gate and the Pfaffenturm tower.

The local history museum, Heimatmuseum in der Eselmühle, was opened in 1974 in a former mill acquired by the city in 1969. The museum displays the original mechanisms of the mill in addition to a collections from various spans of the city's history.

Population growth

¹ Census

Politics

Local council

The elections in May 2014 showed the following results:
 SPD = 5 seats
 CDU = 15 seats
 FW (Free voters) = 8 seats
 GOL (Green open list) = 8 seats
 Total: 36 seats

Mayors since 1804
 1804–1810: Franz Josef von Bentele
 1811–1819: Mathias Tschugg
 1819–1826: Rudolf Salis
 1826–1829: Martin Schnitzer
 1829–1847: Christian Nepomuk Weber
 1847–1859: Leopold Wocher
 1860–1894: Jacob Trenkle
 1894–1922: Rudolf Trenkle
 1922–1933: Fritz Geray
 1933: Gottlob Pfeiffer (provisional)
 1933–1939: Dr Friedrich Wilhelm Erbacher
 1939: Heinrich Fischer (provisional)
 1939–1942: Carl Speidel (on behalf of Heinrich Fischer)
 1942–1945: Max Steinegger (provisional)
 1945: Karl Geiger (provisional)
 1945: Franz Büchele (provisional)
 1945–1946: Josef Max Kraus (provisional)
 1945–1968: Wilhelm Uhl
 1968–2001: Dr Jörg Leist (born 1935)
 since 2001: Michael Lang (born 1965)

Twin towns – sister cities

Wangen im Allgäu is twinned with:
 La Garenne-Colombes, France
 Prato, Italy

Economics and infrastructure
Wangen was once a center of the German textile industry before the decline of German textile manufacturing.

Inter-city transport
Wangen lies on the A96 Autobahn between Lindau and Memmingen, in addition to federal highways 18 and 32. The town is part of the Aulendorf – Kißlegg – Wangen - Hergatz – Lindau and Ulm – Memmingen – Kißlegg – Wangen – Hergatz – Lindau train lines. It lies on the bus route between Ravensburg and Isny. The city also belongs to the Bodensee–Oberschwaben public transportation association.

Education
Wangen has a Gymnasium (Rupert-Neß-Gymnasium), a Realschule (Johann-Andreas-Rauch-Realschule), a Hauptschule (Hauptschule Karsee), a Werkrealschule (Anton-von-Gegenbaur-Schule) and a special school (Martinstorschule), three combined secondary and elementary schools (GHS Niederwangen, Praßberg-Schule and Freie Waldorfschule Wangen) (http://www.fws-wangen.de/start.html), and six elementary schools (Berger-Höhe-Schule, Deuchelried, Grundschule im Ebnet, Leupolz, Neuravensburg, and Schomburg).

The Wangen district has two vocational schools (Friedrich-Schiedel-Schule and Kaufmännischen Schule Wangen), in addition to the Heinrich-Brügger-Schule medical school.

Media
Wangen is serviced by the Schwäbische Zeitung newspaper as well as the local Regio TV television station.

Governmental
Wangen is the seat of a local tax office. It has a district court, which belongs to the  Ravensburg regional court district, which in turn belongs to the Stuttgart court district.

Other
 From 1943 to 1945, Wangen served as the backdrop for the propaganda movie Quax in Fahrt
 From April 14 to May 13, 2004, the city and its surrounding areas served as a setting for the Tatort television series.
 The Wangen Juze Tonne e. V is the oldest autonomously run youth center in Germany.
 The Jugendmusikschule in Wangen is the largest school of music in Baden-Württemberg.

See also
 Swabia
 Allgäu

Notable people
 Roland Bader (born 1938), conductor
 Janik Haberer (born 1994), footballer
 Ernst Jakob Henne (1904–2005), motor cycle racer and world land speed record holder
 Melanie Leupolz (born 1994), soccer player
 Frank Natterer (born 1941), mathematician
 Ivana Rudelic (born 1992), footballer (Bayern Munich)
 Franz Joseph Spiegler (1691–1757), painter
 Patricia Watson-Miller (born 1965), motorcycle rally raid driver
 Sigrid Wille (born 1969), cross-country skier

References

External links

 
 http://www.wangen.de/ 

1802 disestablishments
States and territories established in 1286
Ravensburg (district)
Swabian League
Former states and territories of Baden-Württemberg
Württemberg